Hanna Ulrika Bennison (born 16 October 2002) is a Swedish professional footballer who plays as a midfielder for the FA Women's Super League team Everton. She made her debut for the Sweden women's national football team in November 2019. In January 2020 she was named by UEFA as one of the 10 most promising young players in Europe and in March 2021 she won the Goal (website) NXGN Award as the best young female footballer in the world.

Club career
Bennison is from Lomma and joined her local team GIF Nike as a five year old. She later joined the youth system at FC Rosengård. In April 2018, 15-year-old Bennison made her Damallsvenskan debut as a substitute against IFK Kalmar. She finished the 2018 season with four league appearances.

In 2019 Bennison's development accelerated and she played 18 League games, scoring three goals, as Rosengård won the league title. The club's sporting director Therese Sjögran was surprised by Bennison's rapid progress, and had only expected the youngster to feature in about six league games that season. Despite transfer interest from Olympique Lyon, Bennison did not yet want to leave Malmö, since she was still in school.

Bennison was absent much of the 2020 season due to injuries and COVID-19. As she recovered in 2021, she then faced stiff competition for a starting position in the club, mostly from Ria Öling and Olivia Schough.

In August 2021, Bennison signed a four-year contract with Everton for a "substantial six-figure sum."

International career
On 7 November 2019 Bennison made her senior Sweden debut, in a 3–2 friendly defeat by the United States in Columbus, Ohio. Her chipped pass in the build up to Sweden's first goal was hailed as "something special" by television color commentator Aly Wagner.

National team coach Peter Gerhardsson kept Bennison in the squad for the 2020 Algarve Cup, where she started her first match for the Blågult in a 1–0 defeat by Germany. In Portugal Caroline Seger, a teammate with club and country, acknowledged Bennison's great potential but also tried to temper the burgeoning hype: "[She] is a 17-year-old girl so it is important to be careful with her."

FC Rosengård coach Jonas Eidevall noted in an interview in May 2021 that Peter Gerhardsson has a different philosophy than Pia Sundhage and Thomas Dennerby. The earlier national team coaches pretty much excluded players who didn't always start in their club. Gerhardsson doesn't think so, something Eidevall expressed relief over and referenced him saying that he (Gerhardsson) can only start with eleven players and need good substitutions too. Eidevall believes it could be favourable for Hanna Bennison to prove herself as a good substitute player as well, as it would give her a wider repertoire and more possibilities.

International goals

Honours 
Individual

 IFFHS World's Best Youth (U20) Player: 2021

References

External links
 
 
 
 Profile at Everton F.C. (woman)
 

2002 births
Living people
People from Lomma Municipality
Swedish women's footballers
Sweden women's international footballers
Damallsvenskan players
Women's association football midfielders
FC Rosengård players
Footballers at the 2020 Summer Olympics
Olympic footballers of Sweden
Olympic medalists in football
Medalists at the 2020 Summer Olympics
Olympic silver medalists for Sweden
Sportspeople from Skåne County
UEFA Women's Euro 2022 players